Priboy is a rural locality (a settlement) in Kabansky District, Republic of Buryatia, Russia. The population was 38 as of 2010. There are 2 streets.

Geography 
Priboy is located 106 km southwest of Kabansk (the district's administrative centre) by road. Rechka Mishikha is the nearest rural locality.

References 

Rural localities in Kabansky District
Populated places on Lake Baikal